Fort Hope Airport  is located adjacent to the First Nations community of Eabametoong, also known as Fort Hope, Ontario, Canada.

Airlines and destinations

References

Certified airports in Kenora District